Planeta Azul (English: Blue Planet) is the debut album by Spanish singer Ruth Lorenzo. It was released on 27 October 2014 by Roster Music. The album was preceded by singles "Dancing in the Rain", which represented Spain in the Eurovision Song Contest 2014  in Denmark, and "Gigantes". Renuncio was released as the third single in February 2015. Lorenzo has released a lot of lyric videos and videoclips (including "Flamingos" and "Patito Feo") to promote the album, too.

The Special Edition of the album was released in October 2015, one year later and peaked at number 3 on the official Spanish Charts.

Promotion

Gira Planeta Azul 
On 3 August 2015, Lorenzo made an announcement in Spain that she would embark on her very first solo tour in October 2015.

Cancelled shows 

{{hidden
| headercss = background: #ccccff; font-size: 100%; width: 65%;
| contentcss = text-align: left; font-size: 100%; width: 75%;
| header = Setlist
| content = 
Act 1
Intro
 «Noche en Blanco»
 «Planeta Azul»
 «Flamingos»
 «99»
 «Vulnerable»
 «Eva»

 Act 2 - Acustic Set
  «Hallelujah» (Leonard Cohen)
 «The Edge of Glory» (Lady Gaga)
 «Diamond Doors»

Act 3
  «Dancing in the Rain»
 «Patito Feo»
 «Gigantes»
 «Te Veo»

Act 4
  «Royals» (Lorde)
 «Renuncio»
 «Echo»
}}

Singles
"Dancing in the Rain" was released as the lead single from the album on 18 February 2014. "Gigantes" was released as the second single from the album on 7 October 2014. "Renuncio" was released as the third single from the album on 17 February 2015. "99" was released as the lead single of the Special Edition and fourth overall on 28 August 2015.

Track listing

Chart performance

Weekly Charts

Release history

References

2014 albums